"Grind with Me" is a single by the R&B group Pretty Ricky, off their 2005 debut album Bluestars. It reached #7 on the Billboard Hot 100 and was certified platinum by the RIAA. The song was included in the 2005 film Deuce Bigalow: European Gigolo.

A remix version featured a verse by rapper White Dawg, while an explicit version of the track was titled "Grind On Me" and contained more adult lyrics.

Track listings 

 CD 1
 "Grind With Me"
 "Everybody Get Up" (featuring Pitbull)

 Enhanced CD 2
 "Grind With Me"
 "Grind With Me" (Instrumental)
 "Everybody Get Up" (featuring Pitbull)
 "Grind With Me" (Video)
 "Grind With Me" (VB)

Charts

Weekly charts

Year-end charts

Release history

References

External links 

 

2005 singles
Pretty Ricky songs
Song recordings produced by Jim Jonsin
2005 songs
Atlantic Records singles
2005 debut singles
Songs written for films